Nick Acocella (February 7, 1943 – June 20, 2020) was an American political journalist and author. He was the editor and publisher of Politifax, a weekly newsletter about New Jersey politics.

He was the host of the NJTV show Pasta & Politics.

Early life and education
Acocella was born in 1943 at Margaret Hague Maternity Hospital in Jersey City, New Jersey, and grew up in West New York, New Jersey.

He graduated from St. Peter's Preparatory School. He went to La Salle University in Philadelphia and spent a year studying in Vienna, Austria. He then studied English literature at the University of California, Berkeley.

He taught at Indian Hills High School in Oakland, New Jersey.

He went to graduate school at Stony Brook University and the University of Delaware.

Politifax 
In 1997, Acocella started Politifax, a weekly newsletter about New Jersey politics. It was initially a fax service and then transitioned to email. An annual subscription was $400 for 46 issues. The newsletter had a design which never changed, a white background with letters in a simple black font.

Pasta & Politics
In 2015, Acocella started hosting a television show, Pasta & Politics on NJTV, where he would interview various New Jersey politicians while making pasta dishes. Guests included Thomas Kean, Cory Booker, Chris Christie, and Stephen Sweeney.

Baseball
Acocella was a lifelong fan of baseball. He wrote 20 books on the subject.

Personal life
He was married to Laura Eliasoph Acocella. They had two children, Bart and Francesca Rebecca Acocella. A resident of Hoboken, New Jersey, he died at his home there on June 20, 2020.

Books
with Donald Dewey The Black Prince of Baseball: Hal Chase and the Mythology of the Game (University of Nebraska Press)
with Donald Dewey Total ballclubs : the ultimate book of baseball teams (Sport Classic, 2005)

References

External links
Nick Acocella
Nicholas Acocella - June 20, 2020
Pasta & Politics
Acocella, Nick [WorldCat Identities]

1943 births
2020 deaths
La Salle University alumni
People from Hoboken, New Jersey
People from Jersey City, New Jersey
People from West New York, New Jersey
St. Peter's Preparatory School alumni
Stony Brook University alumni
University of California, Berkeley alumni
Writers from New Jersey
University of Delaware alumni